Dibromoanthanthrone is a scarlet or orange-red-hue synthetic organic colourant.

It is an anthraquinone derivative, first synthesized in 1913 as a vat dye, C.I. Vat Orange 3 (C.I. 59300), and later on also as a pigment, C.I. Pigment Red 168.

References

Quinones
Vat dyes
Organic pigments
Bromoarenes
Polycyclic aromatic compounds